Sōhekimon'in no Shōshō (藻璧門院少将, dates unknown) was a waka poet and Japanese noblewoman active in the  Kamakura period. Sixty of her poems appear in imperial poetry collections, including Shingoshūi Wakashū, Senzai Wakashū, Shokugosen Wakashū, Gyokuyō Wakashū, Shinsenzai Wakashū, Shinchokusen Wakashū, and others. She is also known as Chūgū no Shōshō (中宮少将).

External links 
E-text of her poems in Japanese

Japanese poets
Japanese women poets
Japanese nobility